Reena Basheer is an Indian actress and dancer. She works in the Malayalam film industry and television.

Early life
Reena Basheer came into lime light through reality show on Amrita TV titled Vanitharatnam. Later she got featured in feature movies, advertisements, television serials and other shows. She is well known for her presentation of programmes especially cookery.

Career
She made her film debut in the Malayalam film Mulla in 2008 and later appeared in many movies. She won the Second Best Actress Award at the Kerala State Television Awards 2016 for her serial, Pokkuveyil.

Personal life
She married Basheer and they have two children: Basheer Binu and Basheer Anjala.

Filmography

Television

Other Shows
As Guest
 Nammal Thammil (Asianet)
 Entertainment News (Asianet News)
 Varthaprabhatham  (Asianet News)
 Don't Do Don't Do (Asianet Plus)
 India Voice (Mazhavil Manorama)
 Celluloid (Manorama News)
 Smart Show (Flowers TV)
 Flowers TV Awards (Flowers TV)
 Rhythm (Kairali TV)
 Ente Priyaganangal (Surya TV)
 Flowers Oru Kodi (Flowers TV)

Endorsements
 Nirapara
 Radhas Soap
 Thomson Multiwood
 Ruchi
 KSFE

References

External links

Living people
Year of birth missing (living people)
Actresses in Malayalam cinema
21st-century Indian actresses
Actresses in Malayalam television